Callum Mills (born 2 April 1997) is a professional Australian rules footballer and co-captain of the Sydney Swans in the Australian Football League (AFL). He won the 2016 NAB AFL Rising Star Award for his outstanding breakout season.

Early life
Mills was born in Sydney and grew up on the Northern Beaches. His grandfather, Ray Mills, played Australian rules football for the Perth Football Club in the West Australian Football League (WAFL) and represented Western Australia through the 1960s. Callum was an avid Sydney Swans supporter as a child and idolised Swans' forward Tony Lockett. He began playing Australian rules football at the age of four through the Auskick junior program, but gave the game away at seven years of age to play rugby union with his school friends. He played representative junior rugby with Warringah Rugby Club's underage representative team which won three consecutive state championships (2008-2010) alongside Brad Parker and Simon Kennewell.

In 2010, aged 13, Mills was approached by then-Sydney Swans chairman Andrew Pridham to fill in for the Mosman Swans junior Australian rules football team. He impressed enough to be placed in the Sydney Swans talent academy later that year and gave up rugby union. Mills later revealed the Swans' academy was the major influence in his decision to play Australian rules football instead of rugby union when he was a teenager. He won the under 16's best and fairest at fourteen years of age for the Mosman Swans and he was ultimately named club champion in 2012. In 2014–15, he was cleared to play in the TAC Cup competition as a member of the NSW/ACT Rams and during this period he also played four games for North Shore in the premier division of the Sydney AFL competition.

AFL career
Mills was selected by the Sydney Swans with their first selection and third overall in the 2015 national draft. He was given the number 14 guernsey, made famous by three-time Brownlow Medallist and Australian football hall of famer, Bob Skilton and former club captain and Brownlow medallist, Paul Kelly. He made his debut in the eighty point win against , recording 18 disposals in round one, 2016. After the 38-point win against , he was the round 16 nomination for the Rising Star where he recorded 23 disposals, six marks, and four rebound-50s. He was ultimately the winner of the Rising Star, receiving the Ron Evans Medal with 49 votes out of a possible 50. He became the third Sydney Swan to win the award.

Following a promising debut season, Mills re-signed with the Swans on a five-year contract that will see him remain at the club until the end of 2023.

At the start of 2022 he was named one of the Swans co-captains.

Statistics
Updated to the end of the 2022 season.

|-
| 2016 ||  || 14
| 22 || 1 || 3 || 231 || 177 || 408 || 105 || 50 || 0.0 || 0.1 || 10.5 || 8.0 || 18.5 || 4.8 || 2.3 || 0
|-
| 2017 ||  || 14
| 24 || 1 || 2 || 267 || 148 || 415 || 121 || 59 || 0.0 || 0.1 || 11.3 || 6.1 || 17.2 || 5.0 || 2.5 || 0
|-
| 2018 ||  || 14
| 9 || 0 || 1 || 101 || 72 || 173 || 44 || 23 || 0.0 || 0.1 || 11.2 || 8.0 || 19.2 || 4.9 || 2.6 || 3
|-
| 2019 ||  || 14
| 22 || 1 || 0 || 231 || 174 || 405 || 136 || 58 || 0.0 || 0.0 || 10.5 || 7.9 || 18.4 || 6.2 || 2.6 || 0
|-
| 2020 ||  || 14
| 15 || 0 || 1 || 164 || 164 || 271 || 77 || 49 || 0.0 || 0.1 || 10.9 || 7.1 || 18.1 || 5.1 || 3.3 || 2
|-
| 2021 ||  || 14
| 18 || 6 || 1 || 256 || 239 || 495 || 107 || 95 || 0.3 || 0.1 || 14.2 || 13.3 || 27.5 || 5.9 || 5.3 || 18
|-
| 2022 ||  || 14
| 25 || 10 || 3 || 360 || 250 || 610 || 165 || 158 || 0.4 || 0.1 || 14.4 || 10.0 || 24.4 || 6.6 || 6.3 || 21
|- class=sortbottom
! colspan=3 | Career
! 135 !! 19 !! 11 !! 1610 !! 1167 !! 2777 !! 755 !! 492 !! 0.1 !! 0.1 !! 11.9 !! 8.6 !! 20.6 !! 5.6 !! 3.6 !! 44
|}

Notes

Honours and achievements
Team
 McClelland Trophy: 2016

Individual
 Sydney captain: 2022–
 Bob Skilton Medal: 2022
 All-Australian team: 2022
 2× 22under22 team: 2014, 2015
 Brett Kirk Medal: 2018 (round 3)
 AFL Rising Star nominee: 2016 (round 16)

References

External links

1997 births
Australian rules footballers from Sydney
NSW/ACT Rams players
Living people
North Shore Australian Football Club players
Sydney Swans players
Bob Skilton Medal winners
AFL Rising Star winners